Joachim Wedekind (1925–1963) was a German screenwriter. He was a specialist in comedies, and worked with a number of directors including Georg Jacoby.

Selected filmography
 Anonymous Letters (1949)
 Professor Nachtfalter (1951)
 Pension Schöller (1952)
 The Forester's Daughter (1952)
 Secretly Still and Quiet (1953)
 The Divorcée (1953)
 Mask in Blue (1953)
 The Bachelor Trap (1953)
 The Rose of Stamboul (1953)
 Guitars of Love (1954)
 Ten on Every Finger (1954)
 As Long as There Are Pretty Girls (1955)
 Ingrid – Die Geschichte eines Fotomodells (1955)
 I Often Think of Piroschka (1955)
 A Girl Without Boundaries (1955)
 Three Girls from the Rhine (1955)
 The Girl Without Pyjamas (1957)
 Greetings and Kisses from Tegernsee (1957)
 The Ideal Woman (1959)
 A Thousand Stars Aglitter (1959)
 Hello, My Name Is Cox (1959)
 Pension Schöller (1960)

References

Bibliography 
 Noack, Frank. Veit Harlan: The Life and Work of a Nazi Filmmaker. University Press of Kentucky, 2016.

External links 
 

1925 births
1963 deaths
German male screenwriters
Film people from Berlin
20th-century German screenwriters
1963 suicides
Suicides in Germany